The 1956 Queensland state election was held on 19 May 1956.

By-elections
 On 28 November 1953, Horace Davies (Labor) was elected to succeed David Farrell (Labor), who had died on 17 August 1953, as the member for Maryborough.
 On 12 March 1955, Frank Forde (Labor) was elected to succeed Ernest Riordan (Labor), who had died on 9 December 1954, as the member for Flinders.

Retiring Members

Labor
Thomas Crowley MLA (Cairns)
James Larcombe MLA (Rockhampton)

Liberal
Tom Kerr MLA (Sherwood)

Candidates
Sitting members at the time of the election are shown in bold text.

See also
 1956 Queensland state election
 Members of the Queensland Legislative Assembly, 1953–1956
 Members of the Queensland Legislative Assembly, 1956–1957
 List of political parties in Australia

References
 

Candidates for Queensland state elections